Le Petit Versailles is a New York City community garden in the Lower East Side neighborhood. It was established in 1996 by artists Peter Cramer and Jack Waters, who wanted to create a queer public space in the city. The garden is a part of the NYC Department of Park's GreenThumb program. The garden regularly holds calls for proposals for artistic works or events and hosts community events such as exhibitions, readings, live performances, and film screenings.

History
Peter Cramer and Jack Waters had been artistic collaborators in New York since the 1980s. They became co-directors of the ABC No Rio space after curating an art exhibition there together, and both joined the Visual AIDS collective. The garden site on 2nd Street had been an auto chop shop, before that was demolished. Cramer and Waters built the garden together, in 1996.

In the aftermath of September 11 attacks and the protests against the 2004 Republican National Convention in New York, the garden became a refuge and organizing space for activists. In 2006, the garden began broadcasting footage from its arts events on the Manhattan Neighborhood Network, a local public TV channel, as LPVTV.

References

External links
 Official website
 2018 oral history interview with Jack Waters
 2007 oral history interview with Peter Cramer and Jack Waters
 LPVTV videos

Community gardening in New York City
Parks in Manhattan
Lower East Side
LGBT culture in New York City